Romashevsky Pogost is a rural locality (a selo) in Zaborskoye Rural Settlement, Tarnogsky District, Vologda Oblast, Russia. The population was 159 as of 2002. There are 3 streets.

Geography 
Romashevsky Pogost is located 17 km west of Tarnogsky Gorodok (the district's administrative centre) by road. Sverchkovskaya is the nearest rural locality.

References 

Rural localities in Tarnogsky District